Ricardo Passano (April 19, 1922 in Caballito, Buenos Aires – December 13, 2012  in Ituzaingo) was an Argentine actor. He starred in the acclaimed Silver Condor-winning 1943 film Juvenilia. Other notable roles include Cuando en el cielo pasen lista (1945) and El mal amor (1955).

Selected filmography
 The Three Rats (1946)
 Rhythm, Salt and Pepper (1951)

References

External links
 

Argentine male film actors
1922 births
2012 deaths
Male actors from Buenos Aires
20th-century Argentine male actors